The following is a list of known orogenies organised by continent, starting with the oldest at the top. The organization of this article is along present-day continents that do not necessarily reflect the geography contemporary to the orogenies. Note that some orogenies encompass more than one continent and might have different names in each continent. Likewise some very large orogenies include a number of sub-orogenies. As with other geological phenomena orogenies are often subject to different and changing interpretations regarding to their age, type and associated paleogeography. In some interpretations, especially in the older literature, the term orogeny is equivalent to a long "Episode" of basin formation and deposition of sediments (with durations of hundreds of millions of years), ending with deformation (sometimes including  metamorphism) of these deposits. Some workers use the term only for the final mountain building deformation "Event" with a small duration of tens of millions of years or even shorter.  

.

African orogenies 
 , Neoproterozoic Era (550 Ma)

Antarctic orogenies 
Orogenies affecting Antarctica include:
  – (4000±200 Ma) 
  – ( Ma) 
 , (c. 3000 Ma) 
  – (2650±150 Ma) 
  – (2000–1700 Ma) 
  – (1000±150 Ma) 
  – (633–620 Ma) 
  – (c. 550 – c. 480 Ma)

Asian orogenies 

 Aravalli-Delhi Orogen  – Precambrian
 Altaid Orogeny  – Paleozoic Era
 , during the Permian Period
 Cimmerian and Cathaysian orogenies
 Active through Triassic and Jurassic Periods along south and southeast Asia.
 Dabie-Sulu orogeny  – Mesozoic Era
 Persia–Tibet–Burma orogeny – Cenozoic Era; caused by the continuing collision of the Arabian and Indian Plates with the Eurasian Plate, encompassing:
 Himalayan orogeny – Forming the Himalaya Mountains

European orogenies 
  – Formation of an extensive area of tonalitic-trondhjemitic crust in Fennoscandia, (3.1–2.9 Ga)
  – Formation of two different types of terrain compatible with plate tectonic concepts. One is a belt of high-grade gneisses formed in a regime of strong mobility, while the other is a region of granitoid intrusions and greenstone belts surrounded by the remnants of a Saamian substratum, (2.9–2.6 Ga)
 , (2.0–1.75 Ga)
  – Formation of tonalitic-granodioritic plutonic rocks and calc-alkaline volcanites (like the previous Svecofennian orogeny), (1.75–1.5 Ga)
  – Essentially reworking of previously formed crust, (1.25 Ga – 900 Ma)
  – Affecting the northern Baltic Shield during the Neoproterozoic Era, (620–550 Ma)
  – On the north coast of Armorica in the Ediacaran/Cambrian, (660–540 Ma)
  – Deformation of the western Scandinavian Peninsula, Britain and Ireland, in the Ordovician Grampian phase and the Silurian Scandian phase
  – Deformation in western Iberia, southwest Ireland, southwest England, central and western France, southern Germany and Czech Republic, during the Devonian and Carboniferous Periods
 , during the Permian Period. 
 , encompassing:
 The Formation of the Alps, during the Eocene through Miocene Periods
  – Building the Carpathian Mountains of eastern Europe, during the Jurassic-Cretaceous to Miocene Period
  – In Greece and the Aegean area, during Eocene through Miocene Periods

North American orogenies 

  – Superior province, South Dakota to Lake Huron, late Archean Eon (2700–2500 Ma)
  – Along western edge of Canadian shield, (2100–1900 Ma)
  – Extends from Hudson Bay west into Saskatchewan then south through the western Dakotas and Nebraska. Result of the collision of the Superior craton with the Hearne craton and the Wyoming craton, during the Proterozoic Eon (2000–1800 Ma)
  – (1910–1770 Ma)
  – Collision at the southern margin of the North Atlantic Craton, late Paleoproterozoic Era (1850–1720 Ma)
  – Wisconsin, Minnesota, Michigan, and southern Ontario, (1850–1840 Ma)
  – Proterozoic collision between the Hearne craton and the Wyoming craton in southwest Montana, (1770 Ma)
  – Mojave region, south western U.S.
 , (1710–1700 Ma)
  – Mid to south western U.S., (1675–1650 Ma)
  – Mid to south western U.S., (1430–1300 Ma)
  – Worldwide, during the late Proterozoic Eon (1300–1000 Ma). Associated with the assembly of the supercontinent Rodinia. Formed folded mountains in eastern North America from Newfoundland to North Carolina, (1100–1000 Ma)
 , including:
  – From Cryogenian to Devonian Periods
  – In the northeastern U.S. and Canada, during the Ordovician Period
  – In the eastern U.S., during the Silurian and Devonian Periods
  – Usually seen as the same as the Variscan orogeny in Europe
 Appalachian Mountains is a well studied orogenic belt resulting from a late Paleozoic collision between North America and Africa.  
 
 
 
   Ouachita Mountains of Arkansas and Oklahoma is an orogenic belt that dates from the late Paleozoic Era and is most likely a continuation of the Appalachian orogeny west across the Mississippi embayment – Reelfoot Rift zone.
  – Ancestral Sierra Nevada, western U.S., from late Devonian Period to early Mississippian age
  – Innuitian Mountains, Canadian Arctic, extending from Ellesmere Island to Melville Island, Mississippian age (345 Ma)
  – Rocky Mountains, western North America, (270–240 Ma)
  – Developed along western North America, during the Jurassic Period
  – Rocky Mountains, western North America, (140–50 Ma)
  – Rocky Mountains, western North America, (40–70 Ma)
  – Transverse Ranges, western North America, Pleistocene Period to present day

Oceania orogenies

Australian orogenies 

  – Gawler Craton, South Australia, (2440–2420 Ma)
  – Glenburgh Terrane, Western Australia, ( Ma)
  – MacArthur Basin, northern Australia, (c. 1890–1850 Ma)
  – Gawler Craton, South Australia, (c. 1845–1700 Ma)
  – Gawler Craton, South Australia
  – Gawler Craton, South Australia
  – North Yilgarn craton margin, Western Australia, (c. 1765 Ma)
  – Western Australia, (c. 1710–1020 Ma)
  – Gascoyne Complex, Western Australia, (c. 1680–1620 Ma)
  – Mount Isa Block, Queensland, (c. 1600 Ma)
  – Gawler Craton, South Australia, (1570–1555 Ma)
  – Olary Block, South Australia 
  – Gascoyne Complex, Western Australia
  – Musgrave Block, Central Australia, (c. 1080 Ma)
  – Gascoyne Complex, Western Australia, (c. 920–850 Ma)
  – Central Australia, late Neoproterozoic Era to Cambrian Period (c. 550–535 Ma)
  – South Australia and Victoria, Ordovician Period, (c. 514–510 Ma)
  – Victoria and New South Wales, (c. 540 and 440 Ma)
  – Northern continuation of the Lachlan Orogeny
  – Central Australia, early Carboniferous Period, (450–300 Ma)
  – Victoria and New South Wales, Carboniferous Period (c. 318 Ma)
  – Queensland and New South Wales, Permian Period to Triassic Period (c. 260–225 Ma)

New Zealand orogenies 
 , (370–330 Ma)
 , (142–99 Ma)
 , (24 Ma – present)

South American orogenies 
  – Paleoproterozoic 
Guriense orogeny
 
 
  – Brasilia Belt
  – Paraguai Belt
 
 
 
 
 
  – Sierra de la Ventana
 , Chilean Coast Range, (300–330 Ma)
 , Andes Mountains, (200 Ma – present)

References

Events in the geological history of Earth
Orogenies
Tectonics